The fifth season of the police procedural drama NCIS premiered on September 25, 2007 and marks the end of Donald P. Bellisario's involvement as show runner. The new showrunner, starting from this season, is Shane Brennan. It concludes the La Grenouille storyline which ended with a cliffhanger in season four's finale, "Angel of Death". This season also reveals more background information about Gibbs.

The Writers Guild strike limited episode production and the DVD set had five discs instead of six. The season ended with its 19th episode on May 20, 2008; the strike-caused gap is between episodes 11 and 12. The season ended with a two-part season finale called "Judgment Day". The season featured the departure of recurring characters Colonel Hollis Mann and Jeanne Benoit, as well as the death of Jenny Shepard, one of the main characters.

From this season on, the opening sequence was shortened to 30 seconds instead of the normal 37–44 seconds that was present in the previous seasons.

Cast

Main 
 Mark Harmon as Leroy Jethro Gibbs, NCIS Supervisory Special Agent (SSA) of the Major Case Response Team (MCRT) assigned to Washington's Navy Yard
 Michael Weatherly as Anthony DiNozzo, NCIS Senior Special Agent, second in command of MCRT
 Cote de Pablo as Ziva David, Mossad Liaison Officer to NCIS
 Pauley Perrette as Abby Sciuto, Forensic Specialist for NCIS
 Sean Murray as Timothy McGee, NCIS Junior Special Agent
 Lauren Holly as Jenny Shepard, NCIS Director (Episodes 1-18)
 David McCallum as Dr. Donald "Ducky" Mallard, Chief Medical Examiner for NCIS

Recurring 
 Joe Spano as Tobias Fornell, FBI Senior Special Agent
 Brian Dietzen as Jimmy Palmer, Assistant Medical Examiner for NCIS
 Darby Stanchfield as Shannon Gibbs, Gibbs' deceased wife
 Muse Watson as Mike Franks, retired Senior Special Agent for NCIS and Gibbs' former boss
 Scottie Thompson as Jeanne Benoit, Tony's girlfriend while undercover
 Armand Assante as René Benoit, NCIS target
 Susanna Thompson as Hollis Mann, Gibbs' girlfriend and Army CID Agent
 David Dayan Fisher as Trent Kort, CIA Agent
 Rocky Carroll as Leon Vance, NCIS Assistant Director
 Brenna Radding as Kelly Gibbs, Gibbs' deceased daughter
 Susan Kelechi Watson as Nikki Jardine, NCIS Intelligence Analyst 
 Jonathan LaPaglia as Brent Langer, FBI Special Agent and former member of Gibbs' team
 Paul Telfer as Corporal Damon Werth

Episodes

DVD special features 
Cast and Crew Commentaries on Selected Episodes
Requiem Revisited
N.C.I.S. Season 5: Stem to Stern
The Dressing Room: The Costumes and Wardrobe of N.C.I.S.
N.C.I.S. on Location
From Pauley to Abby: Hairspray, Lipstick and Tattoos

References 

General references 
 
 
 
 

2007 American television seasons
2008 American television seasons
NCIS 05